Tedd T., born Tedd Andrew Tjornhom (CHURN-home), is a music producer, songwriter, arranger, programmer, and engineer.  He launched the independent record label Teleprompt Records in 2003 as a joint venture with Word/Warner Music Group. His interest in the music industry began in his teens while growing up in Minneapolis, Minnesota. His early work with Dez Dickerson (an early member of Prince's band "The Revolution") served as an introduction to the influential Minneapolis scene and later led him to Nashville.

Credits

References

Living people
American record producers
American male musicians
Year of birth missing (living people)